Shine Wrestling (stylized as SHINE Wrestling and often referred to simply as SHINE) is an American, New York based independent women's professional wrestling promotion. It is the sister promotion to Shimmer Women Athletes and airs events on Internet pay-per-view (iPPV).

History
Shine was created as the sister promotion of Shimmer Women Athletes, and it was established by Sal Hamaoui in 2012. It held its first event Shine 1 on July 20, 2012. Sal Hamaoui is the bookers for the promotion.

The company use to hold its events at The Orpheum in Ybor City, Florida. Now it runs shows in Woodside, NY and Queens, NY.

In 2015, WWNLive opened its own training facility in Trinity, Florida named "World Wrestling Network Academy", which Shine shares with Dragon Gate USA, Evolve and Full Impact Pro.

On October 24, 2016, WWNLive and FloSports announced a new streaming service, which would host events held by the WWNLive promotions, including Shine.

Championships

Events

References

External links

Women's professional wrestling promotions
 
2012 establishments in Florida
Independent professional wrestling promotions based in Florida